Sharifabad Cultural Centre ( – Sāzmān-e Kesht Vaṣnʿat Sharīfābād) is a cultural centre and village in Sharifabad Rural District, Mohammadiyeh District, Alborz County, Qazvin Province, Iran. At the 2006 census, its population was 126, in 33 families.

References 

Populated places in Alborz County